NBC Orchestra may refer to:

NBC Symphony Orchestra, which existed from 1937 until 1954
The Tonight Show Band, who used the name from 1962 to 1992
Paul Shaffer and the World's Most Dangerous Band, who used the name briefly from 1987 to 1988